Stefano Martinoli (born 21 September 1935) is an Italian rower. He competed in the men's single sculls event at the 1956 Summer Olympics.

References

External links
 

1935 births
Living people
Italian male rowers
Olympic rowers of Italy
Rowers at the 1956 Summer Olympics
Sportspeople from the Province of Varese